Royal Air Force Melton Mowbray or more simply RAF Melton Mowbray is a former Royal Air Force station located  south of the centre of Melton Mowbray, Leicestershire and  south east of Loughborough, Leicestershire, England.

History

The Class A airfield was originally intended for aircraft maintenance but was taken over by RAF Transport Command. Many types of aircraft were flown from the airfield, including Supermarine Spitfire, de Havilland Mosquito, Vought F4U Corsair, Vultee A-31 Vengeance, Grumman F6F Hellcat, Douglas C-47 Dakota and Handley Page Halifax aircraft, plus Airspeed Horsa and Waco Hadrian gliders.

Units
 No. 4 Aircraft Preparation Unit between 5 July 1944 and 9 October 1944.
 Mk X AI Conversion Flt between 29 August 1944 and 8 September 1944.
 No. 306 Ferry Training Unit between 13 October 1943 and 15 January 1944.
 No. 307 Ferry Training Unit between 14 October 1943 and 15 January 1944.
 No. 304 Ferry Training Unit between 3 January 1944 and 9 October 1944.
 No. 1 Ferry Pilot Pool between 14 January 1944 and 16 March 1944.
 No. 1341 Special Duties Flt during 1944.
 'J' Flt between 28 September 1945 and 5 October 1945.
 No. 12 Ferry Unit between 9 October 1944 and 7 November 1945.

Post war

Between 1946 and 1958 the site was used as a Polish Resettlement Corps camp housing Polish Air Force personnel and their relations.

Melton Mowbray served as a Thor Strategic missile site between 1959 and 1963, when 254(SM) Squadron operated a flight of three missiles from the base.

Current use

The airfield now houses a small industrial estate including padstore self storage, terminal 1, lounds pallets and JCR commercial Ltd. Little of the original infrastructure has Survived (2 Runways, 3 Access Road and A Small Brick House)

A YouTube video published in 2019 shows the current use of the runway.

See also
 List of former Royal Air Force stations

References

Citations

Bibliography

External links

 BBC - WW2 People's War - The End of the War
 Airfield Information Exchange - Melton Mowbray

Royal Air Force stations in Leicestershire
Melton Mowbray
1942 establishments in England
Military units and formations established in 1942
Military units and formations disestablished in 1964